
Year 354 (CCCLIV) was a common year starting on Saturday (link will display the full calendar) of the Julian calendar. At the time, it was known as the Year of the Consulship of Constantius and Constantius (or, less frequently, year 1107 Ab urbe condita). The denomination 354 for this year has been used since the early medieval period, when the Anno Domini calendar era became the prevalent method in Europe for naming years.

Events 
 By place 

 Roman Empire 
 Emperor Constantius II recalls his Caesar (and cousin) Constantius Gallus to Constantinople after hearing unfavorable reports about him. Gallus, Caesar of the East, has suppressed revolts in Palestine and central Anatolia. Constantius strips him of his powers and later has him executed in Pola (Croatia).
 The Roman Calendar of 354, an illuminated manuscript, is drawn up and becomes the earliest dated codex.

 Europe 
 As a result of the armies of the West having been largely withdrawn by the usurper Magnus Magnentius, to fight Constantius II, hordes of barbarians (Franks and Alemanni) cross the upper Rhine into Gaul and invade the lands of the Helvetians.
 The Bulgars are first mentioned in extant European chronicles.

 China 
 Fu Sheng, emperor of the Former Qin, reigns in northern China.

 By topic 

 Religion 
 Libanius becomes a teacher of rhetoric in Antioch; his students include John Chrysostom and Theodore of Mopsuestia.

Births 
 November 13 – Augustine of Hippo, African bishop (d. 430)
 Apa Bane, Christian hermit and saint (approximate date)
 Paulinus of Nola, French bishop and writer (d. 431)
 Pelagius, English monk and theologian (d. 418)

Deaths 
 Constantina, daughter of Constantine the Great (b. c. 320)
 Constantius Gallus, Roman consul and statesman (b. 326)
 Fu Xiong (or Yuancai), Chinese general and politician
 Pei, Chinese princess and wife of Zhang Chonghua
 Ran Zhi, Chinese nobleman and prince of Ran Wei
 Xie Ai, Chinese general of Former Liang (b. 301)

References